Daniel Wesley is a Canadian alternative rock musician from White Rock, British Columbia.

Biography
Singer and guitarist Wesley was born in 1981 in White Rock and raised in Brookswood, British Columbia, singing in choirs since elementary school and being part of ukulele and concert bands in high school. At age 15, he formed his first band, The Dropouts, and later was front man of the bands General Mayhem, Audiophile, and Replica.

Wesley, who sometimes performs with a band aptly titled the Daniel Wesley Band, recorded his first two albums, Outlaw (2006) and Driftin''' (2007), independently. His third album, Sing and Dance, proved to be a commercial success and garnered him much praise nationwide. The album also generated his most successful single to date, "Ooo Ohh". The Province rock music critic Tom Harrison wrote: "Sing and Dance has a prominent reggae element but there is also an unvarnished rock sound that sometimes recalls Neil Young."

As of 2019, Wesley has released eight studio albums, one EP, and one live recording. His latest release, titled Beach Music, came out on 26 September 2019.

Discography
 Outlaw (2006)
 Driftin (2007)
 Sing and Dance (2007)
 Daniel Wesley (2009)
 Easy Livin' (2011)
 Ocean Wide (2013)
 I Am Your Man (2015)
 Beach Music EP (2019)
 Beach Music'' (2019)

References

External links
 

1981 births
Canadian alternative rock musicians
Canadian rock guitarists
Canadian male guitarists
Electricians
Living people
Musicians from Vancouver
People from Langley, British Columbia (city)
People from White Rock, British Columbia
21st-century Canadian guitarists
21st-century Canadian male musicians